Parvoplaca is a genus of lichen-forming fungi in the family Teloschistaceae. The genus was circumscribed in 2013 by Ulrik Søchting, Patrik Frödén, and Ulf Arup.

As of July 2021, the genus contains six species.

Species
Parvoplaca athallina 
Parvoplaca chelyae 
Parvoplaca nigroblastidiata  – Europe; Alaska
Parvoplaca servitiana 
Parvoplaca suspiciosa 
Parvoplaca tiroliensis

Description
Parvoplaca is a genus of crustose lichens with small, usually yellow or blackened apothecia. No pycnidia are seen.

Distribution and habitat
Parvoplaca is mainly distributed in polar regions but also in the boreal zone and the Mediterranean.

Species of Parvoplaca generally grow on moss or detritus but are also found growing on bark.

References

Lichen genera
Teloschistales
Taxa described in 2013
Teloschistales genera